Landing Zone 1 and Landing Zone 2, also known as LZ-1 and LZ-2 respectively, are landing facilities on Cape Canaveral Space Force Station for recovering components of SpaceX's VTVL reusable launch vehicles. LZ-1 and LZ-2 were built on land leased in February 2015, on the site of the former Cape Canaveral Launch Complex 13. SpaceX built Landing Zone 2 at the facility to have a second landing pad, allowing two Falcon Heavy boosters to land simultaneously.

Site
Landing Zones 1 and 2 are located at the former location of Launch Complex 13, which has been demolished and replaced by two circular landing pads  in diameter and marked with a stylized X from the SpaceX company logo.  Four more  diameter pads were initially planned to be built to support the simultaneous recovery of additional boosters used by the Falcon Heavy, although only one extra pad has been built. Planned infrastructure additions to support operations includes improved roadways for crane movement, a rocket pedestal area, remote-controlled fire suppression systems in case of a landing failure, and a large concrete foundation, away from the future three landing pads, for attaching the booster stage when taking the rocket from vertical to horizontal orientation.

Operations at the facility began after seven earlier landing tests by SpaceX, five of which involved intentional descents into the open ocean, followed by two failed landing tests on an ocean-going platform.
As of March 2, 2015, the Air Force's sign for LC-13 was briefly replaced with a sign identifying it as Landing Complex.  The site was renamed Landing Zone prior to its first use as a landing site.
Elon Musk indicated in January 2016 that he thought the likelihood of successful landings for all of the attempted landings in 2016 would be approximately 70 percent, hopefully rising to 90 percent in 2017, and cautioned that the company expects a few more failures.

In July 2016, SpaceX applied for permission to build two additional landing pads at Landing Zone 1 for landing the boosters from Falcon Heavy flights.

In May 2017, construction on a second, smaller pad began, called Landing Zone 2. By June 2017, the landing pad was modified with a radar reflective paint, to aid with landing precision.

Falcon 9 boosters mostly lands on LZ-1 pad and rarely lands on LZ-2, except in cases when a Cape Canaveral launched booster cannot land on LZ-1, as a previous booster is still sitting on that pad, as in case of Hakuto-R Mission 1's booster B1073.5 on 11 December 2022. The LZ-1 was already occupied by Oneweb Flight#15's booster B1069.4 launched on 8 December 2022, so LZ-2 was used by a Falcon 9 for the first time.

Landing history

LZ-1

LZ-2

Booster landings

Detailed history 
For landings at sea, see Autonomous spaceport drone ship

After approval from the FAA, SpaceX accomplished its first successful landing at the complex with Falcon 9 flight 20 on December 22, 2015 UTC; this was the 8th controlled-descent test of a Falcon 9 first stage. A second successful landing at LZ-1 took place shortly after midnight, local time (EDT) on July 18, 2016, as part of the CRS-9 mission, which was the Falcon 9's 27th flight. The third successful landing was by the CRS-10 mission's first stage on February 19, 2017, which was the Falcon 9's 30th flight. Landing Zone 2 was first used by the maiden launch of Falcon Heavy on February 6, 2018, when the rocket's two side boosters touched down on LZ-1 and LZ-2.

See also 

 SpaceX reusable launch system development program
 Autonomous spaceport drone ship, used to recover first stage boosters at sea

References

External links 
 Computer animation of planned launch and landing of Falcon Heavy boosters (SpaceX)

SpaceX facilities
Cape Canaveral Space Force Station
Buildings and structures completed in 2015
SpaceX related lists